Ali Al-Omair (born 1958) is a Kuwaiti politician. From January 2014 through November 2015, he served as Oil Minister in the cabinet of Jaber Al-Mubarak Al-Hamad Al-Sabah, succeeding Mustafa Jassem Al-Shamali. He was a member of the Kuwaiti National Assembly, representing the third district. Born in 1958, Al-Omair obtained a PhD in chemistry and worked as a professor before being elected to the National Assembly in 2006. While political parties are technically illegal in Kuwait, Al-Omair affiliates with the Islamic Salafi Alliance party.

Supported Zakat law
In November 2007, the parliament voted 51-2 to approve a law requiring all Kuwaiti public and shareholding companies to pay Zakat every year. Al-Omair was one of the main proponents of the bill.

References

Members of the National Assembly (Kuwait)
Living people
1958 births
Islamic Salafi Alliance politicians
Oil ministers of Kuwait